Terrence Frederick Scammell (born January 10, 1958) is a Canadian voice actor and voice director.

In a career that has spanned more than 30 years, Scammell worked on hundreds of series, live-action films, documentaries and video games for BBC, PBS, Syfy, Teletoon, Ubisoft and other production companies around the world.

Scammell received an ACTRA award for voicing the character of Darph Bobo on Tripping the Rift, and his directing work has been nominated for awards in North America, Europe, and the U.K.

He is married to writer and blogger Sheila Singhal and divides his time between Montreal and Ottawa. He is a member of ACTRA and the Canadian Actors' Equity Association unions.

Selected voice directing credits

Animation and live action 

 Post-sync/ADR

Specials, documentaries and feature films 

 Post-sync/ADR

Voice acting

Animated series

Animated features and specials

Video games

References

External links 
 Official site

1958 births
Living people
20th-century Canadian male actors
21st-century Canadian male actors
Anglophone Quebec people
Canadian casting directors
Canadian male video game actors
Canadian male voice actors
Canadian voice directors
Male actors from Montreal